Suren Spandari Spandaryan (1882 in Tiflis – 24 September 1916 in Krasnoyarsk) was an Armenian revolutionary in the Russian Empire, literatary critic, publicist and one of the founders of the Bolshevik faction of the Russian Social Democratic Labour Party. In January 1912, he was elected to the Central Committee of the Bolsheviks at the Prague Conference. In March of the same year, Spandaryan was arrested in Baku. Lenin, who considered Spandaryan a "very valuable and prominent worker"  supported  Spandaryan's father financially after the arrest, since the latter at that time lived in Paris without any means.  Spandaryan was sentenced to lifelong exile to Siberia, where he died four years later.

Honors

There is a statue of him in Yerevan. The towns of Spandaryan, Shirak, Spandaryan, Syunik and Surenavan are named after him.

See also
List of statues in Yerevan

References

1882 births
1916 deaths
Writers from Tbilisi
People from Tiflis Governorate
Old Bolsheviks
Armenian literary critics
Armenian male writers
Writers from the Russian Empire